Alpert is a variation of the Jewish surname Heilprin, and may refer to:

Given name
 Alpert of Metz (died 1024), Benedictine chronicler

Surname
 Bradley Alpert, American computational scientist
 Craig Alpert, American film editor
 Daniel Alpert, American investment banker
 Dede Alpert (born 1945), American former politician
 Harry Alpert (1912–1977), American sociologist
 Herb Alpert (born 1935), American musician
 Hollis Alpert (1916–2007), American film critic and author
 Jane Alpert (born 1952), American radical who conspired in the bombings of eight New York City buildings in 1969
 Jenni Alpert, American pop singer-songwriter
 Jon Alpert (born c. 1948), American reporter and documentary filmmaker
 Joseph Alpert (born 1942), American cardiologist and professor of medicine
 Max Alpert (1899–1980), Soviet photographer
 Michael Alpert (born 1955), Jewish entertainer
 Mordechai Dovid Alpert (1850–1918), Lithuanian Jewish rabbi
 Nisson Alpert (1928–1986), rabbi, disciple of Moshe Feinstein
 Rebecca Alpert (born 1950), American Jewish reconstructionist-Judaism thinker
 Richard Alpert (1931–2019), American Jewish spiritual teacher and writer
 Richard Alpert (artist) (born 1947), American sculptor, abstract filmmaker, and performance artist
 Trigger Alpert (1916–2013), American jazz double-bassist
 Yakov Lvovich Alpert (1911–2010), Russian physicist

Fictional characters
 Richard Alpert (Lost), in the American television series Lost

Alpert may also refer to:
 Alpert Awards in the Arts
 Alpert Medical School, Brown University, Providence, Rhode Island

See also 
 Halpert
 Albert (surname)

References 

Germanic-language surnames
Jewish surnames
Toponymic surnames
Yiddish-language surnames
Surnames from given names